Jay Hooks (born November 12, 1967) is an American Texas blues and electric blues guitarist, singer and songwriter. After gaining national exposure playing in Lavelle White's backing ensemble, Hooks has released three albums to date, appeared on German television and undertaken various tours, including one in Europe.

Life and career
Hooks was born in Houston, Texas, United States. He found early musical inspiration from the recordings of fellow Texans Albert Collins, Billy Gibbons and Stevie Ray Vaughan. In the late 1980s, Hooks played in the bars of Houston, before being asked to play in Lavelle White's backing band. He played on her national tours in 1996, before forming his own band and going solo the following year. In 1997, Hooks recorded his debut album, Hooked Up, at SugarHill Recording Studios in Houston. AllMusic noted that Hooked Up contained "a collection of gritty, rock-tinged electric blues numbers that didn't stray far outside the conventions that his aforementioned guitar heroes had brought into an international spotlight."

The exposure the recording gave Hooks led to a European record executive, Ed van Zyl, offering Hooks a recording contract with the Dutch-based record label Provogue Records.  The resulting self-titled album was made under the tutelage of record producer Ben Elliott. Jay Hooks was recorded by the trio of Hooks (guitars, vocals), Marie Del Prete (bass) and Joe Frenchwood (drums). It was released in late 2000. His Texas rock sound was well received by the critics. At the time Hooks was quoted as saying "... I just plug it in and turn it all up, that's what I do..."   In 2001, Hooks toured across Europe.

Jerry Gaskill played the drums on Hooks next release, the Red Line album (2002), which was also released by Provogue. Red Line mostly contained songs written by Hooks, apart from his cover of Jimi Hendrix's track, "Freedom". In 2003, Hooks played live on the German television show, Rockpalast.

Hooks performed at the Continental Club in Austin, Texas early in 2015. In April that year, he appeared at the House of Blues in Houston.

Discography

See also
List of Texas blues musicians
List of electric blues musicians

References

External links
Live video (2015)

1959 births
Living people
American blues guitarists
American male guitarists
American blues singers
American male singers
Blues rock musicians
Electric blues musicians
Texas blues musicians
Musicians from Houston
Singers from Texas
Songwriters from Texas
Guitarists from Texas
20th-century American guitarists
21st-century American guitarists
20th-century American male musicians
21st-century American male musicians
American male songwriters
Provogue Records artists